Coleophora conspicuella is a moth of the family Coleophoridae found in Asia and Europe.  It was first described by Philipp Christoph Zeller in 1849.

Distribution and habitat
This species can be found in all of Europe (except Ireland), in Siberia, Asia Minor, Syria, Iraq and Altai. These rather vulnerable moths mainly occur in field edges, grassy slopes and scrubland.

Description
In Coleophora conspicuella the wingspan can reach 13–17.5 mm. Forewings of these moths have pale yellow ground colour, with pale streaks and white subcostal stripes, without oblique streaks to costa. Antennae are white, unringed and the scape shows a long tuft.

Biology
The larvae mine leaves and feed on Aster amellus, Aster linosyris, Aster sedifolius, Aster sedifolius canus, Centaurea aspera, Centaurea jacea, Centaurea montana, Centaurea nigra, Centaurea scabiosa and Chrysanthemum species.

They create and live within a movable relatively large, dark brown, lightly curved two-valved sheath case with a narrow ventral keel. It is about 12–15 mm long and has a mouth angle of 30-45°. Full-grown larvae can be found in May.

Gallery

References

External links

 Lepiforum.de
 UK Moths
  Naturhistoriska risksmuseet
 Hants Moths
 Coleophoridae

conspicuella
Leaf miners
Moths described in 1849
Moths of Asia
Moths of Europe
Taxa named by Philipp Christoph Zeller